K. Dane Wittrup is an American engineer currently the Carbon P. Dubbs Professor in Chemical Engineering and Biological Engineering at Massachusetts Institute of Technology. He was Elected to the National Academy of Engineering in 2012. His research has made advancements in protein engineering and biopharmaceutical engineering.

References

Year of birth missing (living people)
Living people
MIT School of Engineering faculty
21st-century American engineers
University of New Mexico alumni
California Institute of Technology alumni